Sport de filles is a 2011 drama film directed by Patricia Mazuy. Original music for this film was composed by John Cale, who had previously worked with Mazuy on her 2000 film Saint-Cyr.

Cast

Marina Hands as Gracieuse
Bruno Ganz as Franz Mann
Josiane Balasko as Joséphine de Silène
Amanda Harlech as Susan
Isabel Karajan as Alice
Olivier Perrier as Gracieuse's father
Lionel Dray as Jacky
Muftie Alpin as Mina
Chiara De Luca as Luisa

References

External links

Films directed by Patricia Mazuy
2011 films
French drama films
Films scored by John Cale
2011 drama films
2010s French films
2010s French-language films